Polymer concrete, also known as Epoxy Granite, is a type of concrete that uses a polymer to replace lime-type cements as a binder. In some cases the polymer is used in addition to Portland cement to form Polymer Cement Concrete (PCC) or Polymer Modified Concrete (PMC). Polymers in concrete have been overseen by Committee 548 of the American Concrete Institute since 1971.

Composition
In polymer concrete, thermoplastic polymers are often used, but more typically Thermosetting resins are used as the principal polymer component due to their high thermal stability and resistance to a wide variety of chemicals.
Polymer concrete is also composed of aggregates that include silica, quartz, granite, limestone, and other high quality material.  The aggregate should be of good quality, free of dust and other debris, and dry.  Failure to fulfill these criteria can reduce the bond strength between the polymer binder and the aggregate.

Polymer concretes commonly known as Epoxy granite are distinct in composition only in that the polymer used is exclusively Epoxy

Uses
Polymer concrete may be used for new construction or repairing of old concrete. The adhesive properties of polymer concrete allow repair of both polymer and conventional cement-based concretes. The corrosion resistance and low permeability of polymer concrete allows it to be used in swimming pools, sewer structure applications, drainage channels, electrolytic cells for base metal recovery, and other structures that contain liquids or corrosive chemicals.  It is especially suited to the construction and rehabilitation of manholes due to their ability to withstand toxic and corrosive sewer gases and bacteria commonly found in sewer systems. Unlike traditional concrete structures, polymer concrete requires no coating or welding of PVC-protected seams. It can also be used as a bonded wearing course for asphalt pavement, for higher durability and higher strength upon a concrete substrate, and in skate parks, as it is a very smooth surface.

Polymer concrete has historically not been widely adopted due to the high costs and difficulty associated with traditional manufacturing techniques. However, recent progress has led to significant reductions in cost, meaning that the use of polymer concrete is gradually becoming more widespread.

Polymer concrete in the form of Epoxy granite is becoming more widely used in the construction of machine tool bases (such as Milling (machining) and Metal lathes) in place of Cast Iron due to its superior mechanical properties and a high chemical resistance.

Properties

The exact properties depend on the mixture, polymer, aggregate used etc. Generally speaking with mixtures used:

The binder is more expensive than cement
Significantly greater tensile strength than unreinforced Portland concrete (since polymer plastic is 'stickier' than cement and has reasonable tensile strength)
Similar or greater compressive strength to Portland concrete
Faster curing
Good adhesion to most surfaces, including to reinforcements
Good long-term durability with respect to freeze and thaw cycles
Low permeability to water and aggressive solutions
Improved chemical resistance
Good resistance against corrosion
Lighter weight (slightly less dense than traditional concrete, depending on the resin content of the mix)
May be vibrated to fill voids in forms
Allows use of regular form-release agents (in some applications)
Product hard to manipulate with conventional tools such as drills and presses due to its density.  Recommend getting pre-modified product from the manufacturer
Small boxes are more costly when compared to its precast counterpart however pre cast concretes induction of stacking or steel covers quickly bridge the gap.

Specifications
Following are some specification examples of the features of polymer concrete:

References

Further reading
 

Concrete